RBSC may refer to:

Rare Books and Special Collections Library, a department of McGill University Library in Canada
Richmond Baseball and Softball Club, a sports club in England
Rose Bay Secondary College, a secondary school in Australia
Royal Bangkok Sports Club, an exclusive sports club in Thailand